Artillery Duel is an artillery game originally written for the Bally Astrocade by Perkins Engineering and published by Bally in 1982. John Perkins wrote the game first in Astro BASIC, submitting it to The Arcadian fanzine, from which it was adapted for the Astro BASIC manual. Perkins subsequently developed the Astrocade cartridge.

Xonox published ports for the Atari 2600, ColecoVision, Commodore 64, and VIC-20. Artillery Duel was featured in several double-ended cartridges—with one game on each end—as well as in a single cartridge.

Gameplay

The game consists of dueling cannons on either side of a hill or mountain of varying height and shape. Each player has control of the incline and force behind the shell launched, the objective being to score a direct hit on the opposing target.  Where many versions gave the player a few tries on the same course, Artillery Duel switches to a new mountain after each turn. When the player does manage to hit the opposing cannon, the reward is a brief animation of comically marching soldiers at the bottom of the screen.

Reception
Danny Goodman of Creative Computing Video & Arcade Games said after visiting the summer 1982 Consumer Electronics Show that "the cleverest graphics award goes to Artillery Duel" for the Bally Astrocade, describing it as "really a graphics showpiece with a little bit of player interaction thrown in".

See also 
 Chuck Norris Superkicks
 Ghost Manor

References

External links
Artillery Duel at Atari Mania

1982 video games
Artillery video games
Atari 2600 games
Bally Astrocade games
ColecoVision games
Commodore 64 games
VIC-20 games
Video games developed in the United States